The Atlantic and Northwestern Railroad was a railroad that served the Upstate region in the period after Reconstruction.

The Atlantic and Northwestern was formed when the Union, Gaffney City and Rutherfordton Railroad, chartered by the South Carolina General Assembly in 1878, changed its name to the Atlantic and Northwestern in 1885.

In 1887, the Atlantic and Northwestern Railroad merged with the Augusta, Edgefield and Newberry Railroad to create the Georgia and Carolina Midland Railroad.

References

Defunct South Carolina railroads
Predecessors of the Southern Railway (U.S.)
Railway companies established in 1885
Railway companies disestablished in 1887
1885 establishments in South Carolina
1887 disestablishments in South Carolina